Hashemites, Hashimites, or Hashimids, may refer to:

 Banu Hashim, the descendants of Hashim ibn Abd Manaf, Arab sub-tribe of the Quraysh
 Hashimi Dress, dress associated with the women of the tribe
 Hashemite (mineral), a very rare barium chromate mineral
 Hashemite royal family of the Hejaz (1916–1925), Iraq (1921–1958), and Jordan (1921–present)
 The Sharifs of Mecca, the rulers of Mecca from the 10th century until 1924, from whom the modern Hashemite royal family descends
 Hashimiyya, a sub-sect of the Kaysanite Shia that acknowledged the Imamate of Abu Hashim ibn Muhammad ibn al-Hanafiyah
Hashimids (Darband), Arab rulers of Derbent in Dagestan
Hashimites of Kakori or Kakori Shaikh, Muslim community in India

See also
 Hashim, name
 Al-Hashimi (surname)